Eumorpha anchemolus, the anchemola sphinx moth, is a moth of the family Sphingidae. The species was first described by Pieter Cramer in 1780.

Distribution 
It is found from Argentina through Central America and into the US state of Texas.

Description 
The wingspan is 110-135  mm. It is a large species. It is similar to Eumorpha triangulum, but the forewing upperside pattern is less contrasting and variegated. There is a conspicuous white fringe on the forewing upperside, found along the posterior margin from near the base to beyond the median rhombiform patch.

Biology 
Adults are on wing year round, except the coldest months. They nectar at various flowers.

The larvae feed on Cissus alata, Cissus pseudosicyoides, Cissus erosa, Vitis and Ampelopsis species.

References

External links

Eumorpha
Moths described in 1780
Taxa named by Pieter Cramer